The Men's javelin throw athletics events for the 2020 Summer Paralympics took place at the Tokyo National Stadium from August 27 to September 4, 2021. A total of 8 events were contested in this discipline.

Schedule

Medal summary
The following is a summary of the medals awarded across all javelin throw events.

Results

F13
Records

Prior to this competition, the existing world, Paralympic, and area records were as follows:

Results

The final in this classification took place on 2 September 2021, at 20:26:

F34
Records

Prior to this competition, the existing world, Paralympic, and area records were as follows:

Results

The final in this classification took place on 1 September 2021, at 9:30:

F38
Records

Prior to this competition, the existing world, Paralympic, and area records were as follows:

Results

The final in this classification took place on 27 August 2021, at 11:06:

F41
Records

Prior to this competition, the existing world, Paralympic, and area records were as follows:

Results

The final in this classification took place on 4 September 2021, at 19:10:

F46
Records

Prior to this competition, the existing world, Paralympic, and area records were as follows:

Results

The final in this classification took place on 30 August 2021, at 11:03:

F54
Records

Prior to this competition, the existing world, Paralympic, and area records were as follows:

Results

The final in this classification took place on 3 September 2021, at 10:08:

F57
Records

Prior to this competition, the existing world, Paralympic, and area records were as follows:

Results

The final in this classification took place on 28 August 2021, at 19:00:

F64
Records

Prior to this competition, the existing world, Paralympic, and area records were as follows:

Results

The final in this classification took place on 30 August 2021, at 19:00:

References

Athletics at the 2020 Summer Paralympics
2021 in men's athletics